Oxygen is an extended play by American experimental rock band Swans. It was released digitally on November 25, 2014 through frontman Michael Gira's own label, Young God Records.

Background
The EP features four different versions of the title track "Oxygen", originally from the band's 2014 album, To Be Kind. The versions include an edit by Mute Records founder Daniel Miller, a live version recorded at Primavera Sound festival, an early version recorded at band leader Michael Gira's home studio and an acoustic version recorded at Studio Mute.

Critical reception

PopMatters critic Eric Risch wrote: "Despite none of the four versions here reaching the original's length, the Oxygen EP is not fuel efficient enough for the daily commute and provides more torque than required for a Sunday drive." Risch further added: "Revealing the true horsepower behind "Oxygen", this collection should be handled by a professional driver on a closed course."

Track listing

Personnel
Credits adapted from Oxygen liner notes

Swans
 Michael Gira – vocals, guitar, production
 Christoph Hahn – lap steel guitars, electric guitar, vocals
 Thor Harris – drums, percussion, vibes, wind instruments, vocals
 Christopher Pravdica – bass guitar, acoustic guitar, vocals
 Phil Puleo – drums, percussion, dulcimer, vocals
 Norman Westberg – guitar, vocals

Additional personnel
 Daniel Miller – editing (track 1)
 Bob Biggs – artwork

References

External links
 Oxygen EP at Swans' official Bandcamp page
 Oxygen EP on Young God Records' official website

2014 EPs
Swans (band) EPs
Young God Records EPs
Mute Records EPs
Albums produced by Michael Gira